Secret Agent (translit. Podvig razvedchika) is a 1947 Soviet spy film directed by Boris Barnet and based on the novel The Deed Remains Unknown by Mikhail Maklyarsky. The film stars Pavel Kadochnikov in the leading role. Secret Agent is also known as Secret Mission, Secrets of Counter-Espionage, The Scout's Exploit.

It was the first film about the actions of Soviet intelligence officers behind enemy lines in World War II. The film originated the spy genre in Soviet cinema and had a great influence on all subsequent Soviet spy films, including Seventeen Moments of Spring. It is based on real events from the biography of Nikolai Khokhlov.

The film was the leader of Soviet distribution in 1947 and had 22.73 million viewers.

Plot

Soviet intelligence officer Aleksei Fedotov by the name of Heinrich Eckert departs for German-occupied Vinnytsia. His purpose is to obtain the secret correspondence of General Kuhn with the Hitler's headquarters. When his radio operator, sent to Aleksei, is executed, Fedotov is forced to search for a contact through the local underground, but accidentally he discovers that one of the underground workers is a provocateur.

Cast
Pavel Kadochnikov as major Aleksei Fedotov
Amvrosy Buchma as Grigory Leschuk
Viktor Dobrovolsky as Chief
Dmitri Milyutenko as Berezhnoy
Sergey Martinson as Willi Pommer
Mikhail Romanov as Erich von Rummelsburg
Pyotr Arzhanov as Karpovsky
Boris Barnet as general von Kuhn
Yelena Izmailova as Theresa Gruber
Valentina Ulesova as Nina
Sergei Petrov as Astakhov
Viktor Khalatov as Friedrich Pommer
 as Frau Pommer
Aleksei Bykov as Medvedev
Gennady Nilov as episode

Awards
 1948 - Stalin Prize of 2nd degree to director, designer (Morits Umansky), scenarios and Pavel Kadochnikov.

External links

  Podvig razvedchika

1947 films
1940s spy films
Soviet spy films
1940s Russian-language films
Films directed by Boris Barnet
World War II spy films
Eastern Front of World War II films
Films set in Ukraine
Films about Nazi Germany
Soviet black-and-white films

Films about the Soviet Union in the Stalin era
Films set in the Soviet Union